Anshe Sfard is a synagogue in the Uptown neighborhood of New Orleans, Louisiana.

The congregation was founded by Hasidic Jews from Lithuania.  The congregation today is Modern Orthodox.  and is located in a historic building at 2230 Carondelet Street.  Anshe Sfard's 1925 building features a barrel-vaulted ceiling ribbed with beams studded with electric light bulbs. This decorative feature was common at the time, inspired by the great excitement over the newly invented incandescent bulb.  The Rundbogenstil exterior is brick, with triple arched Neo-Byzantine doors.

After Hurricane Katrina, Anshe Sfard was damaged and did not reopen until 2006. The synagogue's Torah scrolls were rescued during Hurricane Katrina.

The congregation, located a short walk from downtown hotels in the beautiful Garden District, welcomes tourists and business travelers to attend services.

References

External links
 , Anshe Sfard Synagogue of New Orleans

Lithuanian-Jewish culture in the United States
Byzantine Revival synagogues
Modern Orthodox synagogues in the United States
Rundbogenstil synagogues
Synagogues in New Orleans